Eudocima jordani, the Jordan's fruit piercing moth, is a moth of the family Erebidae. It is found on New Guinea and Queensland, Australia. Adults are considered a commercial pest. They damage fruit by piercing the skin to suck juice.

The wingspan is about 70 mm. Adult males have subtly patterned dark brown forewings, and bright orange hindwings that have broad black margins and a large black spot in the middle. The wings have scalloped margins. The abdomen is orange. Females are similar, but have a broad yellow diagonal band across each forewing.

The larvae feed on Tinospora smilacina.

External links
 Australian Faunal Directory
 Australian Insects

Moths of Australia
Eudocima
Moths described in 1900
Moths of New Guinea